Sua County (itu malo Sua) is a county in the Eastern District in American Samoa. Su'a County contains the villages of Afono, Fagaitua, Falefa (including the settlements of Alega, Amaua, Auto, Avai'o and a portion of the settlement of Pagai), Lauli'i, Masefau, Masausi and Sailele. The county had a population of 3,323 as of the 2010 U.S. Census. According to the Constitution of American Samoa, Sua County is represented by two senatorial seats in the American Samoa Senate.

Demographics

Su'a County was first recorded beginning with the 1912 special census. Regular decennial censuses were taken beginning in 1920.

Villages
 Āfono
Fagaitua
Falefa (including Ālega, Amaua, Auto, Avai'o and a portion of Pagai)
Lauli'i
Masefau
Masausi
Sa'ilele

Points of interest

Ālega Beach
Faga'itua Bay
Lions Head (Faalogologotala Rock)
National Park of American Samoa
Pyramid Rock (Fatuto'aga Rock)
Rainmaker Mountain
Sa'ilele Beach
Tisa's Barefoot Bar
Two Dollar Beach

References 

 

Populated places in American Samoa